Póvoa de Varzim Municipal Stadium (Portuguese Estádio Municipal da Póvoa de Varzim) is a multi-use stadium in the city park of Póvoa de Varzim, Portugal.

The stadium is designed for football and athletics, includes a 400-metre track portion of Athletics with 8 corridors in sportflex pavement. The stadium opened in 2003 and is able to hold only 1,050 people, as there is only the western siting sectors while the rest of the stadium is surrounded by small hills where one can watch the games lying down on the grass. The stadium project was a cooperation between architect Victor Mogadouro, who designed the buildings, and notable landscape architect, Sidónio Pardal.

In the Euro 2004 competition, it was used as a training field by the Bulgarian National Team. It is mostly used as the main stage for the Póvoa de Varzim People's Championship in football, a popular football league consisting of football clubs from Póvoa de Varzim's neighbourhoods and villages.

Football venues in Portugal
Buildings and structures in Póvoa de Varzim
Sport in Póvoa de Varzim
Sports venues in Porto District
Sports venues completed in 2003